The Clifford Road Air Raid Shelter, located under the playground of Clifford Road Primary School in Ipswich was built during the first months of World War II.  It was an unusually solid construction, capable of holding several hundred people.  After the war, it was sealed up and largely forgotten.

In 1989, workmen digging a pond in the school grounds discovered one of the original stairways leading into the shelter.  The structure had survived with little more than a few leaks.

The Museum

Today, the shelter is preserved as a museum, is open to the public and to private & school groups.  The displays in the lengthy tunnels take a visitor through various aspects of life during the war, including rationing and military activity.  One section of the tunnels recreates the conditions when the shelter was in use, with dim lighting, wooden benches, and the sounds of an air raid outside.

The museum is open the first weekend of each month from April to October, with some additional evening openings.  It is also possible to arrange guided tours and group visits at other times.

External links
 http://www.cliffordroadschool.org.uk/air-raid-shelter-museum/

United Kingdom home front during World War II
Museums in Suffolk
World War II museums in the United Kingdom
History museums in Suffolk
Buildings and structures in Ipswich